The following is a list of current American Football Conference (AFC) team rosters:

AFC East

Buffalo Bills

Miami Dolphins

New England Patriots

New York Jets

AFC North

Baltimore Ravens

Cincinnati Bengals

Cleveland Browns

Pittsburgh Steelers

AFC South

Houston Texans

Indianapolis Colts

Jacksonville Jaguars

Tennessee Titans

AFC West

Denver Broncos

Kansas City Chiefs

Las Vegas Raiders

Los Angeles Chargers

See also
List of current NFC team rosters

AFC